Manabendra Nath Roy (born Narendra Nath Bhattacharya, better known as M. N. Roy; 21 March 1887 – 25 January 1954) was an Indian revolutionary, radical activist and political theorist, as well as a noted philosopher in the 20th century. Roy was the founder of the Mexican Communist Party and the Communist Party of India (Tashkent group).

He was also a delegate to congresses of the Communist International and Russia's aide to China. In the aftermath of World War II Roy moved away from orthodox Marxism to espouse the philosophy of radical humanism, attempting to chart a third course between liberalism and communism.

Early life (1887–1910s)

Early years

Narendra Nath "Naren" Bhattacharya, later known as M. N. Roy, was born on 21 March 1887 at Arbelia, located in the North 24 Parganas of West Bengal, near Calcutta (Kolkata).

The Bhattacharyas were Sakta Brahmins – a family of hereditary priests. Naren's paternal grandfather was the head priest of the goddess Kheputeswari in the village of Kheput, located in the Midnapore district of West Bengal. Naren's father also served for a time in priestly capacity there. With 12 children in his family, he moved to the village of Arbelia and got a new job.

Following the death of his first wife, the elder Bhattacharya married Basantakumari Devi, the niece of Dwarkanath Vidyabhusan. He was then appointed as a teacher of Sanskrit in the nearby Arbelia English school. The couple had a total of eight children, including the fourth-born Naren.

Naren Bhattacharya's early schooling took place at Arbelia. In 1898 the family moved to Kodalia. Bhattacharya continued his studies at the Harinavi Anglo-Sanskrit School, at which his father taught, until 1905. Tall for his age (eventually growing to 6 feet), Bhattacharya was strong and athletic.

Bhattacharya later enrolled at the National College under Sri Aurobindo, before moving to the Bengal Technical Institute (now Jadavpur University), where he studied Engineering and Chemistry. However, much of Bhattacharya's knowledge was gained through self-study.

Indian Independence Movement
Towards the end of the 19th century revolutionary nationalism began to spread among the educated middle classes of Bengal, inspired by the writings of Bankim and Vivekananda. Naren Bhattacharya was swept up in this movement, reading both of these leading luminaries.

According to one biographer, Roy gained an appreciation from Bankim that true religion required one not to be cloistered from the world, but to work actively for the public good; Vivekananda reinforced this notion of social service and further advanced the idea that Hinduism and Indian culture was superior to anything the Western world could offer.

With his cousin and childhood friend Hari Kumar Chakravarti (1882–1963), he formed a group of free-thinkers including Satcowri Banerjee and the brothers, Saileshvar and Shyamsundar Bose. Two other cousins of Bhattacharya and Chakravarti, Phani and Narendra Chakravarti, often came from Deoghar, where they went to school with Barin Ghosh. A mysterious Vedic scholar, Mokshadacharan Samadhyayi, who was an active organiser of secret branches of the Anushilan Samiti in Chinsura, started joining this Bhattacharya group.

In July 1905 a partition of Bengal was announced, scheduled to start in October. A spontaneous mass movement aimed at annulment of the partition emerged, giving radical nationalists like Naren Bhattacharya and his co-thinkers an opportunity to build broader support for their ideas. Following his expulsion from high school for organising a meeting and a march against the partition, Bhattacharya and Chakravarti moved to Kolkata and joined in the active work of the Anushilan.

Under Mokshada's leadership, on 6 December 1907 Bhattacharya successfully committed the first act of political theft to raise money for the secret society. When arrested, he was carrying two seditious books by Barin Ghosh. Defended by the Barrister J. N. Roy (close friend of Jatindranath Mukherjee or Bagha Jatin) and the pleader Promothonath Mukherjee, he got released on bail, thanks to his reputation as a student and social worker. 
 
Unhappy with Barin's highly centralised and authoritative way of leadership, Bhattacharya and his group had been looking for something more constructive than making bombs at the Maniktala garden. Two incidents sharpened their interest in an alternative leadership.

Barin had sent Prafulla Chaki with Charuchandra Datta to see Bagha Jatin at Darjeeling who was posted there on official duty, and do away with the Lt. Governor; on explaining to Prafulla that it wasn't the right time, Jatin promised to contact him later. Though Prafulla was much impressed by this hero, Barin cynically commented that it would be too much of an effort for a Government officer to serve a patriotic cause. Phani returned from Darjeeling, after a short holiday: fascinated by Jatin's charisma, he informed his friends about the unusual man. On hearing Barin censuring Phani for disloyalty, Bhattacharya decided to see that exceptional Dada and got caught for good.

The Howrah-Shibpur Trial (1910–11) brought Bhattacharya closer to Jatindra Mukherjee.

The Indo-German Conspiracy
Many Indian nationalists, including Roy, became convinced that only through an armed struggle against the British would they be able to separate India from the British Empire. To further this end, revolutionary nationalists looked to a rival imperial power, that of Kaiser Wilhelm's Germany, as a potential source of funds and weapons.

In August 1914, World War I began, affecting both the UK and Germany. Expatriate Indian nationalists organised as the Indian Revolutionary Committee in Berlin made an informal approach to the German government in support of aid to the cause of anti-British armed struggle in India. These contacts were favourable and towards the end of the year word reached India the Germans had agreed to provide money and necessary materials to start an armed struggle against British rule. Revolution seemed near.

The task of getting funds and armaments for the coming struggle was entrusted to Naren Bhattacharya. Bhattacharya was sent to Java, where over the next two months he was able to obtain limited funds, and no armaments.

Early in 1915, Bhattacharya set out again, leaving India in search of vaguely promised German armaments which were believed to be en route, somewhere on the Pacific. Roy would not see his homeland again for 16 years.

The actual plan seemed fantastic, as Bhattacharya-Roy later recounted in his posthumously published memoirs:

"The plan was to use German ships interned in a port at the northern tip of Sumatra, to storm the Andaman Islands and free and arm the prisoners there, and land the army of liberation on the Orissa coast. The ships were armoured, as many big German vessels were, ready for wartime use. they also carried several guns each. The crew was composed of naval ratings. They had to escape from the internment camp, seize the ships, and sail.... Several hundred rifles and other small arms with an adequate supply of ammunition could be acquired through Chinese smugglers who would get then on board the ships."

At the last minute, money for the conduct of the operation failed to materialise and "the German Consul General mysteriously disappeared on the day when he was to issue orders for the execution of the plan," Bhattacharya recalled.

Disgusted but still holding out hope, Bhattacharya left Indonesia for Japan, hoping to win Japanese support for their cause, despite Japan's nominal alliance with Great Britain. There he met with Chinese nationalist leader Sun Yat-sen, who had escaped to Japan following the failure of a July 1913 uprising in Nanking.

Sun Yat-sen refused to assist Bhattacharya in his task of organising an anti-British revolution in India, instead informing Roy that Japanese support would  prove sufficient. His own inability to assist them was due to Hong Kong's status as a British colony, Sun's base of operations in South China. Efforts to raise money from the German Ambassador to China were likewise unsuccessful.

Bhattacharya's activities soon drew the attention of the Japanese secret police, who were concerned about Bhattacharya's drumming up a revolution. When he learnt he was about to be served formal notice to leave Japan within 24 hours, and not wishing to be deported to Shanghai, Bhattacharya immediately set about leaving the country overland through Korea.

He tried to make his way from there to Peking (Beijing), but by this time he was spotted and identified by the British secret police, who detained him. However, Bhattacharya was able to win his release from the police, due to the British Consul General's ill ease with holding a British subject indefinitely without having formal charges first.

Further efforts to raise funds for armaments from the German consulate at Hankow resulted in a further tentative agreement. However, this plan also came to naught because of the size of the commitment, which had to be approved in Berlin, according to German Ambassador to China Admiral Paul von Hintze. Bhattacharya decided to take his plan for German funding next to the German Ambassador in the United States, before heading to Germany itself. Employees of the German embassy were able to assist Bhattacharya in obtaining a place as a stowaway aboard an American ship with a German crew, bound for San Francisco.

Although they knew he was on board the ship, British colonial authorities stopping the vessel in international waters were unable to locate Bhattacharya in the secret compartment in which he was hurriedly hidden. In an effort to throw the British off his trail – and in an effort to obtain more suitable accommodations for the long trans-Pacific voyage, Bhattacharya stealthily disembarked at Kobe, Japan.

In Kobe Bhattacharya used a false French-Indian passport previously obtained for him by the Germans in China. Posing as a seminary student bound for Paris, Bhattacharya obtained an American visa, bought a ticket, and sailed for San Francisco.

As world communist movement (1910s–1929)
During his stay in Palo Alto, a period of about two months, Roy met his future wife, Evelyn Leonora Trent (alias Shanthi Devi). The pair fell in love and journeyed together across the country to New York City.

It was in the New York City public library that Roy began to develop his interest in Marxism. His socialist transition under Lala owed much to Bankim Chandra Chatterjee's essays on communism and Vivekananda's message of serving the proletariat. Noting the presence of British spies, Roy fled to Mexico in July 1917 with Evelyn. German military authorities, on the spot, gave him large amounts of money.

The Mexican president Venustiano Carranza and other liberal thinkers appreciated Roy's writings for El Pueblo. The Socialist Party he founded (December 1917), was converted into the Communist Party of Mexico in 1919, the first Communist Party outside Russia. The Roys lodged a penniless Mikhail Borodin, the Bolshevik leader, under special circumstances. Due to a grateful Borodin's reports on Roy's activities, Moscow planned to invite Roy to the 2nd World Congress of the Communist International, held in Moscow during the summer of 1920.

A few weeks before the Congress, Vladimir Lenin personally received Roy with great warmth. At Lenin's behest, Roy formulated his own ideas as a supplement to Lenin's Preliminary Draft Theses on the National and the Colonial Questions.

Material from Roy's pen was published by International Press Correspondence (Inprecor), the weekly bulletin of the Communist International. Roy served as a member of the Comintern's Presidium for eight years and at one stage was a member of the Presidium, the Political Secretariat, the Executive Committee, and the World Congress.

Commissioned by Lenin to prepare the East – especially India – for revolution, Roy founded military and political schools in Tashkent. In October 1920, as he formed the Communist Party of India (Tashkent group), he contacted his erstwhile revolutionary colleagues who, at this juncture, were determining allegiances between Radicalism (Jugantar) and Mohandas K. Gandhi's novel programme.

Close to the Jugantar in spirit and action, C. R. Das inspired Roy's confidence. From Moscow, Roy published his major reflections, India in Transition, which was almost simultaneously translated into other languages. In 1922 Roy's own journal, the Vanguard, which was the organ of the emigre Communist Party of India, was first published. These were followed by The Future of Indian Politics (1926) and Revolution and Counter-revolution in China (1930), while he had been tossing between Germany and France.

Leading a Comintern delegation appointed by Joseph Stalin to develop agrarian revolution in China, Roy reached Canton in February 1927. Despite fulfilling his mission with skill, a disagreement with the CCP leaders and Borodin led to a fiasco. Roy returned to Moscow where factions supporting Leon Trotsky and Grigory Zinoviev were busy fighting with Stalin's. Here he voted for Trotsky's expulsion from the Executive Committee of the Comintern.

Stalin refused to meet Roy and give him a hearing at the plenum in February 1928. Denied a decent treatment for an infected ear, Roy escaped with Nikolai Bukharin's help, sparing himself Stalin's anger. Shortly after Trotsky's deportation, on 22 May 1928, Roy received the permission to go abroad for medical treatment on board a Berlin-bound plane of the Russo-German Airline Deruluft. In December 1929, the Inprecor announced Roy's expulsion from the Comintern, almost simultaneously with Bukharin's fall from grace.

In India (1930–1954)
M.N Roy returned to India for the first time in December 1930. Upon reaching Bombay, Roy met leaders like Jawaharlal Nehru and Subhas Bose, the former of whom recalled that despite significant political differences, "I was attracted to him by his remarkable intellectual capacity."

Roy's political activity in India proved to be brief, on 21 July 1931 he was arrested in Bombay on an arrest warrant issued in 1924. Roy was taken to Kanpur to face charges under Section 121-A of the Indian Penal Code, "conspiring to deprive the King Emperor of his sovereignty in India."

No trial was held in open court; rather, the proceedings were conducted inside the jail in which Roy was held. Roy was allowed neither trial by jury nor defense witnesses, nor was he allowed to make a defense statement. Proceedings were conducted from 3 November 1931 until 9 January 1932, at which time Roy was sentenced to 12 years of rigorous imprisonment.

Roy was taken immediately under armed guard to Bareilly Central Jail for completion of his sentence managing, however, he was able to smuggle out the defence statement which he was not allowed to present in court. This disallowed declaration was published in full by Roy's supporters in India as My Defence, and in abridged form in New York as I Accuse.

Roy was unapologetic for his advocacy of the use of armed struggle against British colonial rule, in his own defence declaring

Roy filed an appeal in his case to the Allahabad High Court, but this was dismissed on 2 May 1933 – although Roy's sentence was at the same time reduced from 12 years to 6 by the court. Roy ultimately served 5 years and 4 months of this term, sitting in five different jails. Dismal prison conditions took a severe toll on Roy's health, and he suffered lasting damage to his heart, kidneys, lungs, and digestive tract as a result of his time behind bars. Roy also lost several teeth, was frequently feverish, and suffered constant pain from a chronically infected inner ear.

Despite his imprisonment, Roy still managed to contribute to the Indian independence movement. A steady stream of letters and articles were smuggled out of jail. He also wrote a 3000-page draft manuscript provisionally titled The Philosophical Consequence of Modern Science. His followers, including A. A. Alwe, formed the Bombay Provincial Working Class Party in 1933 to continue his work while he was imprisoned.

Released in November 1936 in broken health, Roy went to Allahabad for recovery, invited by Nehru. Defying the Comintern order to boycott the Indian National Congress, Roy urged Indian Communists to join this Party to radicalise it. Nehru, in his presidential address at Faizpur session in December 1936, greeted the presence of Roy, as

From the podium Roy in his speech recommended the capture of power by Constituent Assembly. Unable to collaborate with Gandhi, however, Roy was to stick to his own conviction. In April 1937, his weekly Independent India appeared and was welcomed by progressive leaders like Bose and Nehru, unlike Gandhi, and the staunch Communists who accused Roy of deviation.

Personal life and Radical humanist
In marrying Ellen Gottschalk, his second wife, "Roy found not only a loving wife but also an intelligent helper and close collaborator." They settled in Dehra Dun. Roy proposed an alternative leadership, seized the crisis following Bose's re-election as the Congress President, in 1938: in Pune, in June, he formed his League of Radical Congressmen. Disillusioned with both bourgeois democracy and communism, he devoted the last years of his life to the formulation of an alternative philosophy which he called Radical Humanism and of which he wrote a detailed exposition in Reason, Romanticism and Revolution.

In his monumental biography, In Freedom's Quest, Sibnarayan Ray writes: 

With the declaration of World War II, Roy (in a position close to that of Sri Aurobindo) condemned the rising totalitarian regimes in Germany and Italy, instead supporting England and France in the fight against fascism. He severed connections with the Congress Party and created the Radical Democratic Party in 1940. Gandhi proceeded to lead the Quit India movement in August 1942. In response, the British colonial government imprisoned without trial almost the entire Indian National Congress leadership within hours. Roy's line was clearly different from that of the mainstream of the independence movement. According to Roy, a victory for Germany and the Axis powers would have resulted in the end of democracy worldwide and India would never be independent. In his view India could win her independence only in a free world. On the other hand, Subhas Chandra Bose took the stance that The enemy of my enemy is my friend, leading him to seek alliances with Axis powers. Escaping house-arrest and India, Bose formed the Azad Hind Provisional Indian Government in Exile and allied with the Japanese, bringing the Indian National Army to India's doorstep.

Sensing India's independence to be a post-war reality following the defeat of the Axis powers and the weakening of the British Empire, Roy wrote a series of articles in Independent India on the economic and political structures of new India, even presenting a concrete ten-year plan, and drafting a Constitution of Free India (1944).

Roy in his philosophy devised means to ensure human freedom and progress. Remembering Bagha Jatin who "personified the best of mankind", Roy worked "for the ideal of establishing a social order in which the best in man could be manifest." In 1947, he elaborated his theses into a manifesto, New Humanism, expected to be as important as the Communist Manifesto by Marx a century earlier.

Death and legacy

A planned lecture tour to the United States was canceled on 25 January 1954 due to Roy's death.

Beginning in 1987, Oxford University Press began the publication of the Selected Works of M.N. Roy. A total of 4 volumes were published through 1997, gathering Roy's writings through his prison years. Project editor Sibnarayan Ray died in 2008, however, and the Roy works publishing project was therefore prematurely terminated. Noted personalities like T. M. Tarkunde, Govardhandas Parekh, V. B. Karnik, Sunil Bhattacharya, B. R. Sunthankar, Saleel Wagh, V. R. Jawahire and Dr. Nalini Taralekar were influnced by M. N. Roy and his philosophy.

See also
Communist involvement in the Indian independence movement

References

Bibliography
 Note: Adapted from "A Checklist of the Writings of M.N. Roy" in M.N. Roy's Memoirs. Delhi: Ajanta Publications, 1984; pp. 607–617.
 
 La voz de la India (The Voice of India). Mexico City: n.p., n.d. [c. 1917].
 La India: Su Pasado, Su Presente y Su Porvenir (India: Its Past, Its Present, and Its Future). Mexico City: n.p., 1918.
 Indien (India).  Hamburg: Verlag der Kommunistischen Internationale, 1922.
 India in Transition. With Abani Mukherji. Geneva: J.B. Target, 1922.
 What Do We Want? Geneva: J.B. Target, 1922.
 One Year of Non-Cooperation from Ahmedabad to Gaya. With Evelyn Roy. Calcutta: Communist Party of India, 1923. —Imprint probably fictitious.
 India's Problem and Its Solution. n.c.: n.p., n.d. [c. 1923].
 Political Letters. Zurich: Vanguard Bookshop, 1924. —Alternate title: Letters to Indian Nationalists.
 Cawnpore Conspiracy Case: An Open Letter to the Rt. Hon. J.R. MacDonald. London: Indian Defence Committee, 1924.
 The Aftermath of Non-Cooperation: Indian Nationalism and Labour Politics. London: Communist Party of Great Britain, 1926.
 The Future of Indian Politics. London: R. Bishop [Communist Party of Great Britain], 1926.
 Our Task in India. n.c.: Bengal Committee of the Revolutionary Party of the Indian Working Class, n.d. [c. 1932].
 "I Accuse!" : From the Suppressed Statement of Manabendra Nath Roy on Trial for Treason before Sessions Court, Cawnpore, India. New York: Roy Defense Committee of India, 1932. —Title of unexpurgated Indian edition: My Defence.
 Congress at Crossroads, by a Congressman (M.N. Roy). Bombay: Independence of India League, [c. 1934].
 On Stepping Out of Jail. Bombay: V.B. Karnik, n.d. [c. 1936].
 Letters by M.N. Roy to the Congress Socialist Party, Written in 1934. Bombay: Renaissance Publishing Co., 1937.
 The Historical Role of Islam: An Essay on Islamic Culture. Bombay: Vora, 1937.
 Presidential Address of M.N. Roy, United Provinces Youths' Conference, 29 and 30 May 1937, Sitapur. Bombay: R.D. Nadkarni, n.d. [1937].
 Materialism and Spiritualism: Presidential Address of M.N. Roy at the 3rd Session of the Madras Presidency Radical Youths' Conference, Held at Madras on 25 July 1937. Bombay: R.D. Nadkarni, n.d. [1937].
 My Crime. Bombay: Ramesh D. Nadkarni, n.d. [c. 1937].
 The Russian Revolution: A Review and the Perspective. Calcutta: D.M. Library, n.d. [c. 1937].
 Presidential Address of Com. M.N. Roy, First Rajputana-Central India Students' Conference, Benwar, 1 and 2 January 1938. Bombay: n.p., n.d. [1938].
 All-India Sugar Mill Workers' Conference, Gorakhpur, Held on 30 April and 1 May 1938: Presidential Address by Manabendra Nath Roy. Gorakhpur: n.p., n.d. [1938].
 Fascism: Its Philosophy, Professions and Practice. Calcutta: D.M. Library, 1938.
 On the Congress Constitution. Calcutta: "Independent India" Office, 1938.
 Our Differences. With V.B. Karnik. Calcuta: Saraswaty Library, 1938.
 Our Problems. With V.B. Karnik. Calcutta; Barendra Library, 1938.
 Gandhi vs. Roy: Containing Com. Roy's Letter to Gandhiji, the Latter's Reply and the Former's Rejoinder. Bombay: V.B. Karnik, 1939.
 Heresies of the Twentieth Century: Philosophical Essays. Bombay: Renaissance Publishers, 1939.
 Presidential Address by M.N. Roy at the First All-India Conference of the League of Radical Congressmen, Poona, 27 and 28 June 1939. Bombay: n.p., n.d. [1939].
 Tripuri and After. Nasik: Radical Congressmen's League, n.d. [1930s].
 Which Way, Lucknow? By a Radical Congressman (M.N. Roy). Bombay: M.R. Shetty, n.d. [1930s].
 The Memoirs of a Cat. n.c. [Dehra Dun]: Renaissance Publishers, 1940.
 Whither Europe? Bombay: Vora, 1940.
 The Alternative. Bombay: Vora, 1940.
 From Savagery to Civilisation. Calcutta: Digest Book House, 1940.
 Gandhism, Nationalism, Socialism. Calcutta: Bengal Radical Club, 1940.
 Science and Superstition. Dera Dun: Indian Renaissance Association, 1940.
 Materialism: An Outline of the History of Scientific Thought. Dera Dun: Renaissance Publishers, 1940.
 World Crisis (International Situation). (contributor) Ahmedabad: Gujarat Radical Democratic People's Party, 1940.
 The Relation of Classes in the Struggle for Indian Freedom. Patna: Bihar Radical Democratic People's Party, n.d. [c. 1940].
 Science, Philosophy and Politics. Moradabad: J.S. Agarwal, n.d. [c. 1940].
 A New Path: Manifesto and Constitution of the Radical Democratic Party. Bombay: V.B. Karnik, n.d. [c. 1940].
 Twentieth Century Jacobinism: Role of Marxism in Democratic Revolution. Patna: Radical Democratic Party, n.d. [c. 1940].
 Some Fundamental Problems of Mass Mobilization. Calcutta: D. Goonawardhana, n.d. [c. 1940].
 My Differences with the Congress: Speech at Allahbad University, 27 November 1940. Bombay: V.B. Karnik, League of Radical Congressmen, n.d. [c. 1940].
 On Communal Question. With V.B. Karnik. Lucknow: A.P. Singh, n.d. [c. 1940].
 Culture at the Crossroads: Cultural Requisites of Freedom. Calcutta: Leftist Book Club, n.d. [1940s].
 Radical Democratic Party's Message to the USSR. Calcutta: D. Goonawardhan, n.d. [1940s].
 Presidential Address by Com. M.N. Roy at the Maharashtra Provincial Conference of the Radical Democratic Party held at Poona on 22 and 23 March 1941. Bombay: V.B. Karnik, n.d. [1941].
 The Ideal of Indian Womanhood. n.c. [Dehra Dun?]: Renaissance Publishers, 1941.
 Problem of the Indian Revolution. Bombay: Rajaram Panday, 1941.
 All-India Anti-Fascist Trade Union Conference: Presidential Address by M.N. Roy: Lahore, 29–30 November 1941. Lahore: M.A. Kahn, n.d. [1941].
 Scientific Politics: Lectures in the All India Political Study Camp, Dehradun, May and June 1940: Held under Auspices of All-India League of Radical Congressmen. Dehra Dun: Indian Renaissance Association, 1942.
 Freedom or Fascism? n.c. [Bombay?]: Radical Democratic Party, 1942.
 India and the War. (contributor) Lucknow: Radical Democratic Party, 1942.
 This War and Our Defence. Karachi: Sind Provincial Radical Democratic Party, 1942.
 War and Revolution: International Civil War. Madras: Radical Democratic Party, 1942.
 Origin of Radicalism in the Congress. Lucknow: S.S. Suri, 1942.
 Library of a Revolutionary: Being a List of Books for Serious Political Study. Lucknow: New Life Union, for the Indian Renaissance Association, 1942.
 This Way to Freedom: Report of the All-India Conference of the Radical Democratic Party held in December 1942. (contributor) Delhi: Radical Democratic Party, 1942.
 Nationalism: An Antiquated Cult. Bombay: Radical Democratic Party, n.d. [c. 1942].
 Nationalism, Democracy, and Freedom. Bombay: Radical Democratic Party, n.d. [c. 1942].
 Letters from Jail. n.c. [Dehra Dun?]: Renaissance Publishing, 1943.
 The Communist International. Delhi: Radical Democratic Party, 1943.
 What is Marxism? Bombay: n.p., 1943.
 The Future of Socialism: Talk to the Calcutta Students' Club, November 1943. Calcutta: Renaissance Publishers, n.d. [1943].
 Poverty or Plenty? Calcutta: Renaissance Publishers, 1943.
 Indian Labour and Post-war Reconstruction. Lucknow: A.P. Singh, 1943.
 Indian Renaissance Movement: Three Lectures. Calcutta: Renaissance Publishers, 1944.
 The Future of the Middle Class: Lecture Delivered in Poona on 29 May 1944, in the Annual Spring Lecture Series. Patna: Radical Democratic Party, n.d. [1944].
 Constitution of India, A Draft: Endorsed and Released for Public Discussion by the Central Secretariat of the Radical Democratic Party. Delhi: V.B. Karnik, 1944.
 Your Future: An Appeal to the Educated Middle Class. Issued by the Radical Democratic Party. Lucknow: Radical Democratic Party, 1944.
 Planning a New India. Calcutta: Renaissance Publishers, n.d. [c. 1944].
 National Government or People's Government? Calcutta: Renaissance Publishers, n.d. [c. 1944].
 Constitution of Free India, A Draft by M.N. Roy: Endorsed and Released for Public Discussion by the Radical Democratic Party. Delhi: Radical Democratic Party, 1945.
 The Last Battles of Freedom: Being the Report of the Calcutta Conference of the Radical Democratic Party, 27 to 30 December 1944. Delhi: Radical Democratic Party, n.d. [1945].
 Post-War Perspective: A Peep into the Future. Delhi: Radical Democratic Party, 1945.
 Future of Democracy in India: Being the Full Text of a Speech Delivered at a Public Meeting Held at the Town Hall, Lucknow, on 6 October 1945. Delhi: Radical Democratic Party, n.d. [1945].
 The Problem of Freedom. Calcutta: Renaissance Publishers, 1945.
 My Experiences in China. Calcutta: Renaissance Publishers, 1945.
 Sino-Soviet Treaty. Calcutta: Renaissance Publishers, 1947.
 Jawaharial Nehru. Delhi: Radical Democratic Party, n.d. [c. 1945].
 INA and the August Revolution. Calcutta: Renaissance Publishers, 1946.
 Revolution and Counter-Revolution in China. Calcutta: Renaissance Publishers, 1946. —Published in German in 1931.
 A New Orientation: Statement on the International Situation. Delhi: Radical Democratic Party, 1946.
 A New Orientation: Review and Perspective of the International Struggle for a New World Order of Democratic Freedom, Economic Prosperity, and Cultural Progress. Dehra Dun: Radical Democratic Party, Bengal, 1946.
 New Orientation: Lectures Delivered at the Political Study Camp Held at Dehra Dun, from 8 to 18 May 1946. With Phillip Spratt. Calcutta: Renaissance Publishers, 1946.
 Radical Democratic Party Conference Inaugural Address: Bombay, 20th, 21st, 22 December 1946: Presidential Address and Resolutions. Bombay: V.B. Karnik, n.d. [1947].
 Principles of Radical Democracy: Adopted by the Third All-India Conference by the Radical Democratic Party of India held in Bombay, 26 to 29 December 1946. Delhi: Radical Democratic Party, 1947. —Attributed to Roy.
 Leviathan and Octopus. Delhi: Radical Democratic Party, n.d. [1947].
 Asia and the World: A Manifesto. Delhi: Radical Democratic Party, 1947.
 Science and Philosophy. Calcutta: Renaissance Publishers, 1947.
 New Humanism: A Manifesto. Calcutta: Renaissance Publishers, 1947.
 Beyond Communism. With Philip Spratt. Calcutta: Renaissance Publishers, 1947.
 A New Approach to the Communal Program: Lecture Delivered at the International Fellowship, Madras, 22 February 1941. Bombay: V.B. Karnik, n.d. [c. 1947].
 The Russian Revolution. Calcutta: Renaissance Publishers, 1949.
 India's Message. Calcutta: Renaissance Publishers, 1950.
 The Rhythm of Cosmos: Inaugural Address of the Second All-India Rationalist Conference at Tenali held on 9 and 10 February 1952. Tenali: n.p., n.d. [1952].
 Radical Humanism. New Delhi: n.p., 1952.
 Reason, Romanticism and Revolution. Calcutta: Renaissance Publishers, 1952.
 The Way Ahead in Asia. n.c.: British Information Service in Southeast Asia, n.d. [c. 1950s].
 Crime and Karma, Cats and Women. Calcutta: Renaissance Publishers, 1957.
 Memoirs. Bombay: Allied Publishers, 1964. —Reissued 1984.

Further reading 
 
 R.K. Awasthi, Scientific Humanism: Socio-Political Ideas of M.N. Roy: A Critique. Delhi: Research Publications in Social Sciences, 1973.
 Shiri Ram Bakshi, M.N. Roy. New Delhi: Anmol Publications, 1994.
 N.R. Basannavar, 'The Indian in the Comintern'. University of Bristol Dissertation 2007
 G.P. Bhattacharjee, Evolution of Political Philosophy of M.N. Roy. Calcutta: Minerva Associates, 1971.
 M.N. Roy and Radical Humanism. Bombay: A.J.B.H. Wadia Publication, 1961.
 Phanibhusan Chakravartti, M.N. Roy. Calcutta: M.N. Roy Death Anniversary Observance Committee, 1961.
 Prakash Chandra, Political Philosophy of M.N. Roy. Meerut: Sarup & Sons, 1985.
 Satyabrata Rai Chowdhuri, Leftism in India, 1917–1947. Basingstoke, UK: Palgrave, 2007.
 Ramyansu Sekhar Das, M.N. Roy the Humanist Philosopher. Calcutta: W. Newman, 1956.
 B.N. Dasgupta, M.N. Roy: Quest for Freedom. Calcutta: Firma K.L. Mukhopadhyay, 1970.
 Niranjan Dhar, The Political Thought of M.N. Roy, 1936–1954. Calcutta: Eureka Publishers, 1966.
 S.M. Ganguly, Leftism in India: M.N. Roy and Indian Politics, 1920–1948. Columbia, MO: South Asia Books, 1984.
 Dharmadasa Goonawardhana and Debassaran Das Gupta (eds.), Royism Explained. Calcutta: Saraswaty Library, 1938.
 Michael Goebel,  "Geopolitics, Transnational Solidarity, or Diaspora Nationalism? The Global Career of M.N. Roy, 1915–1930,"European Review of History 21, no. 4 (2014), pp. 485–499.
 D.C. Grover, M. N. Roy: a Study of Revolution and Reason in Indian Politics. Calcutta: Minerva Associates, 1973.
 John Patrick Haithcox, Communism and Nationalism in India; M.N. Roy and Comintern Policy, 1920–1939. Princeton, NJ: Princeton University Press, 1971.
 V.B. Karnik, M.N. Roy: Political Biography. Bombay: Nav Jagriti Samaj, 1978.
 Usha Krishna,  M.N Roy and the Radical Humanist Movement in India: A Sociological Study. Meerut: Chaudhary Charan Singh University, 2005.
 B. K. Mahakul, "Radical Humanism of M.N. Roy," Indian Journal of Political Science, vol. 66, no. 3 (July 2005), pp. 607–618. In JSTOR
 Kris Manjapra, M.N. Roy: Marxism and Colonial Cosmopolitanism. Delhi: Routledge India, 2010.
 Giles Milton Russian Roulette: How British Spies Thwarted Lenin's Global Plot, Sceptre, 2013. 
 Innaiah Narisetti (ed.), M.N. Roy: Radical Humanist: Selected Writings. New York: Prometheus Books, 2004.
 R.L. Nigram, Radical Humanism of M.N. Roy An Exposition of his 22 Theses. n.c.: Indus Publishing Co., n.d.
 Robert C. North and Xenia J. Eudin, M.N. Roy's Mission to China: The Communist-Kuomintang Split of 1927. Berkeley: University of California Press, 1963.
 Vishnudeo Narain Ojha, M.N. Roy and His Philosophical Ideas. n.c. [Muzaffarpur]: Shankhnad Prakashan, 1969.
 Alok Pant, Indian Radicalism and M.N. Roy. Delhi: Adhyayan, 2005.
 Govardhan Dhanaraj Parikh (ed.), Essence of Royism: Anthology of M.N. Roy's Writings. Bombay: Nav Jagriti Samaj, 1987.
 Ramendra, M. N. Roy's New Humanism and Materialism. Patna: Buddhiwadi Foundation, 2001.
 Sibnarayan Ray, In Freedom's Quest: Life of M.N. Roy (Vol. 1: 1887–1922). Calcutta: Minerva, 1998. —No other volumes issued.
 M.N. Roy: Philosopher-Revolutionary: A Symposium. Calcutta: Renaissance Publishers, 1959.
 Dipti Kumar Roy, Leftist Politics in India: M.N. Roy and the Radical Democratic Party. Calcutta: Minerva, 1989.
 Trade Union Movement in India: Role of M.N. Roy. Calcutta: Minerva, 1990.
 Samaren Roy, The Restless Brahmin: Early Life of M.N. Roy. Bombay: Allied Publishers, 1970.
 The Twice-Born Heretic: M.N. Roy and the Comintern. Calcutta: KLM Private, 1986.
 B.S. Sharma, The Political Philosophy of M.N. Roy. Delhi, National Publishing House, 1965.
 Sita Ram Sharma, Life and Works of M.N. Roy. Jaipur: Sublime Publications, 2010.
 M. Shiviah, New Humanism and Democratic Politics: A Study of M.N. Roy's Theory of the State. Bombay: Popular Prakashan, 1977.
 Reeta Sinha, Political Ideas of M.N. Roy. New Delh: National Book Organisation, 1991.
 Sada Nand Talwar, Political Ideas of M.N. Roy. Delhi: Khosla Publishing House, 1978.
 J.B.H. Wadia, M.N. Roy, The Man: An Incomplete Royana.  Bombay: Popular Prakashan, 1983.
 Syamales Das, M. N. Roy, Biplabi, Rajnitik O Darshonik. Calcutta: Sribhumi Publishing Co., 1999.

External links

 Manbendra Nath Roy (1887—1954) at Internet Encyclopedia of Philosophy
 Manabendra Nath Roy Internet Archive, Marxists Internet Archive, www.marxists.org/
 Roy on the cover of Ogonëk, 5 April 1925.
 M. N. Roy materials in the South Asian American Digital Archive (SAADA)

1887 births
1954 deaths
20th-century atheists
20th-century essayists
20th-century Indian non-fiction writers
20th-century Indian philosophers
20th-century Indian social scientists
Anushilan Samiti
Atheist philosophers
Bengali Hindus
Executive Committee of the Communist International
Indian former Hindus
Former Marxists
Hindu–German Conspiracy
Indian atheists
Indian communists
Indian expatriates in Mexico
Indian humanists
Indian male non-fiction writers
Indian male writers
Indian Marxists
Indian political philosophers
Indian prisoners and detainees
Indian revolutionaries
Mexican people of Indian descent
People from North 24 Parganas district
Philosophers of culture
Philosophers of history
Philosophers of social science
Prisoners and detainees of British India
Revolutionaries of Bengal during British Rule
Right Opposition
Scholars from West Bengal
Secular humanists
Indian social commentators
Social philosophers
Writers about activism and social change
Indian independence activists from West Bengal